Martelange is a municipality of Wallonia located in the province of Luxembourg, Belgium.

On 1 January 2007 the municipality, which covers 29.67 km2, had 1,584 inhabitants, giving a population density of 53.4 inhabitants per km2. Besides Martelange itself, the municipality includes the villages of Grumelange and Radelange.

Because fuel, tobacco, and alcohol taxes are lower in Luxembourg than in Belgium, the eastern, Luxembourgish side of this stretch of road has become lined with numerous petrol stations and liquor stores.

History
Between 1830 and 1947, the town was a major slate quarrying centre, though the industry has now completely disappeared.

On August 21, 1967, a French tanker lorry containing 45 000 litres of Liquefied petroleum gas suffered from failing brakes while driving downhill. It exploded in the middle of the village, killing 22 people and injuring 54. Dozens of houses were completely destroyed.

See also
 List of protected heritage sites in Martelange

References

External links
 

 
Belgium–Luxembourg border crossings
Divided cities
Municipalities of Luxembourg (Belgium)
Belgium geography articles needing translation from French Wikipedia